José Luis Mendoza Peña (born 1954) is a Navarrese politician, Minister of Education of Navarre from July 2015 to April 2017.

References

1954 births
Government ministers of Navarre
Geroa Bai politicians
Living people
Politicians from Navarre